The Bernhard Cinader Award is awarded annually by the Canadian Society for Immunology (CSI). It is presented to an immunologist who is an exceptional researcher working in Canada, a full member of CSI and who has an additional activity in which they excel.

This award was inaugurated at the first meeting of the CSI in 1987 and is named in honor of Dr. Bernhard "Hardy" Cinader. The recipient presents the keynote lecture at the annual CSI meeting.

Recipients 

The Bernhard Cinader award lectureship is given to a Canadian scientist who exemplifies distinguished scientific leadership and accomplishments in Immunology.

References

Biomedical awards
Cinader award